This article gives an overview of liberalism in Colombia. It is limited to liberal parties with substantial support, mainly proved by having had a representation in parliament. The sign ⇒ means a reference to another party in that scheme. For inclusion in this scheme it is not necessary for the parties to have labeled themselves as a liberal party.

Introduction
Liberalism in Colombia is organized as the opposition to conservatism. The Colombian Liberal Party, founded in 1849, still exists as a dominant party, usually achieving the largest voter turnouts and electoral victories in congress and regional elections. It has also been a strong contender in recent presidential elections. It joined the Socialist International, despite historically being considered a party relatively left of center and somewhat prone to populism, according to some critics.

Its traditional position can be considered to be somewhere in the middle between liberalism and social democracy. Several current leaders of the party in the late 20th and early 21st centuries claim to be seeking to move the party closer to the social democratic left.

The timeline

Colombian Liberal Party
 1849: The Colombian Liberal Party (Partido Liberal Colombiano) is founded
 1960: Dissident liberals formed the ⇒ Revolutionary Liberal Movement
 1967/1968: Most of the movement returned to the party
 1979: Dissident liberals formed ⇒ New Liberalism. Nuevo liberalismo
 1981: Dissident liberals formed ⇒ People's Power.

Liberal Revolutionary Movement
 1960: A dissident faction of the ⇒ Colombian Liberal Party formed the Liberal Revolutionary Movement (Movimiento Revolucionario Liberal) (MRL)
 1967: Most of the party returned to the ⇒ Colombian Liberal Party
 1968: The party disappeared.

People's Power
 1981: A dissident faction of the ⇒ Colombian Liberal Party formed People's Power (Poder Popular).
 1990s: The party returns to the ⇒ Colombian Liberal Party.

New Liberalism
 1979: A dissident faction of the ⇒ Colombian Liberal Party formed New Liberalism (Nuevo Liberalismo).
 1987: Most of the party and its leaders returned to the ⇒ Colombian Liberal Party.
 1989: Luis Carlos Galán assassinated.
 1990s: The party disappeared.
 2021: The party was refounded.

Uribism
1990s: Many small liberal regional movements are formed as dissidents factions of the main Liberal Party (Independent Civic Movement, LIDER Movement, New Colombia Movement, Liberal  Movement, Civic Popular Convergence, Let's Go Colombia, 98 Movement, Colombia My Country, Democratic Reconstruction Movement, Colombian Popular Party, Citizen's Movement)
2002: Some regional dissident factions return to the main Liberal Party. Other factions regroup in new political movements, most of them associated with the dissidential liberal president Álvaro Uribe (ALAS, United Popular Movement, National Progressist Movement, MORAL, MIPOL, Citizen's Convergence, Let's Go Colombia, Civic Popular Convergence, Radical Change Party, We are Colombia, Colombia Always, New Liberalism, Popular Will, Independent Civic Movement and Social Security Movement)
2003: The political reform allows parliamentarists to regroup themselves. The main Liberal Party becomes oppositor to Uribe's government, while all pro-Uribe members of the liberal party join other parties. The New Party (Nuevo Partido) is formed to unite all pro-Uribe liberals, however, not all of them join this group, as some of them joined Radical Change Party. Most of the previous factions unite in only three parties: Democratic Colombia Party, Living Colombia Movement and Citizen's Convergence Party.
2006: The New Party, along with some members of the liberal party, some of Radical Change, minor liberal and independent movements, plus a small group of conservatives, form the Social National Unity Party, most known as Party of the U, which is currently the biggest party of Colombia. Radical Change Party grows with the fusion with independent liberal and Christian movements. Other three liberal small parties had representation: Democratic Colombia Party, Living Colombia Movement and Citizen's Convergence Party.
2010: Half of the parliamentaries from Radical Change Party switch to Party of the U. The three small liberal movements (Democratic Colombia Party, Living Colombia Movement and Citizen's Convergence Party) unite to become the National Integration Party (PIN).

Liberal leaders
 Partido Liberal: Jorge Eliécer Gaitán - Alfonso López Michelsen - Luis Carlos Galán - César Gaviria

See also
 History of Colombia
 Politics of Colombia
 List of political parties in Colombia

References 

Colombia
Political movements in Colombia